Frostbite is the seventh studio album by Albert Collins, released in 1980 on Alligator Records.

Track listing
"If You Love Me Like You Say" (Little Johnny Taylor) – 4:07
"Blue Monday Hangover" (Gilbert Caple, Deadric Malone) – 5:35
"I Got a Problem" (Gene Barge, Jesse Anderson) – 4:34
"Highway Is Like a Woman" (Percy Mayfield, Joe James) – 4:34
"Brick" (Johnnie Morrisette) – 4:35
"Don't Go Reaching Across My Plate" (Oscar Wills) – 4:34
"Give Me My Blues" (Albert Collins) – 4:13
"Snowed In" (Albert Collins) – 9:12

Personnel
Albert Collins - guitar, vocals
Paul Howard - trumpet
Bill McFarland - trombone
Henri Ford - baritone saxophone 
A.C. Reed - saxophone 
Allen Batts - keyboards
Marvin Jackson - guitar
Johnny Gayden - bass
Casey Jones - drums
Technical
Fred Breitberg - engineer
Jim Matusik - photography

References

1980 albums
Albert Collins albums
Albums produced by Bruce Iglauer
Alligator Records albums